Parachutes is the debut studio album by British rock band Coldplay. It was released on 10 July 2000 by Parlophone in the United Kingdom. The album was produced by the band and British record producer Ken Nelson, except for one track, "High Speed", which was produced by Chris Allison. Parachutes has spawned the singles "Shiver", "Yellow", "Trouble", and "Don't Panic".

The album was a commercial success and was met with positive reviews. Upon release, it quickly reached number one in the United Kingdom and has since been certified 9× Platinum. In the United States, the album peaked at number 51 on the Billboard 200 and eventually was certified double platinum. It won the Grammy Award for Best Alternative Music Album in 2002, the British Album of the Year award at the 2001 Brit Awards and many other accolades. Parachutes is also the 22nd-best-selling album of the 21st century in the United Kingdom. As of 2020, it has sold over 13 million copies worldwide.

Recording and production
The band began production on Parachutes in late 1999, after producing & releasing The Blue Room EP with British record producer Chris Allison. Allison was asked to assist with production, and the band's musical direction, which was desired by both the band & the A&R department. Production started with the track 'High Speed', which was part of the EP and was later re-released as a part of Parachutes. Allison describes 'High Speed' as thus: 'You'll notice it is quite a bit different to the other tracks, because there are other sounds going on in it: we wanted to mix a soundscape in with the classic rock sound on that particular track. I thought 'High Speed' was a really good marriage between the classic rock sound and the new sound that was developing out of it, something that was more atmospheric'. Seven tracks in all were recorded during the sessions at Orinoco studios in London, with three of them ending up on The Blue Room EP.

The band then took a lengthy break to compose more tracks for Parachutes. A few months later, it was arranged that Allison and the band meet at a rehearsal room to finally begin production on the band's debut album. "They started up playing in the rehearsal room and they really weren't together at all. And I was very honest with them, I just sort of said 'Look, this simply isn't good enough'". Allison adds, "The interesting, the most significant thing that did occur out of the fact that we didn't end up starting the album on that day of the rehearsal was that Chris Martin had not written "Yellow" by that time".

A couple of months later, British record producer Ken Nelson was chosen, producing all but one song on Parachutes. He was introduced to Coldplay by his manager Pete Byrne (who gave him a copy of the band's Fierce Panda-distributed debut single in 1999). Nelson has claimed that, as soon as he heard vocalist Chris Martin's voice on the song "Bigger Stronger", he "realised that he was something special". Nelson was offered the job while Coldplay were performing in Liverpool with English indie rock band Gomez (whose debut album, Bring It On, was what he had produced at the time).

Coldplay initially planned to record Parachutes in the space of two weeks. However, tours and other live performances caused the recording to spread out between September 1999 and May 2000. The band began work on the album at Rockfield Studios in Wales, continuing with sessions at Liverpool's Parr Street Studios. The band worked in three studio rooms at Parr Street, mostly in the project studio which producer Ken Nelson describes as "basically a demo room". The Chris Allison-produced track "High Speed" was also included on the album, and originates from earlier sessions at Orinoco Studios in London. The album was mixed by American engineer Michael Brauer in New York. Coldplay's record label, Parlophone, had originally intended to use a mixing engineer for the tracks they picked as singles, but eventually hired Brauer to work on all songs on Parachutes except the song "High Speed" which was mixed by Chris Allison.

At the Liverpool concert where he was offered the production job, Nelson had noted that Coldplay's performance was "very very uptight [...] they rushed through the set and it was quite difficult to listen to". Once in the studio Nelson and the band went through each song, learning how to play the piece live and deciding what tempo to play it at in an attempt to get the group to "calm down" ("Trouble", for example, had to be reworked to eliminate the cacophony included in its early versions).

The album's cover features a photograph of a yellow globe taken with a disposable Kodak camera. The globe had been purchased from W H Smith for £10; it was featured in the music videos for "Shiver" and "Don't Panic", and also accompanied the band on their tours. The album was dedicated to drummer Will Champion's mother, Sara Champion, who died of cancer in May 2000, two months before the release of Parachutes.

Music and style
Champion has explained that Nelson's production style was liberating and allowed the band to feel at ease during the recording of Parachutes (many songs from the album often featured slow tempos). The ensuing album was "a record's worth of moody and atmospheric tunes". As a nod to the moods created by the album, Champion has compared the song lyrics to the 1972 song "Perfect Day" by American rock singer-songwriter Lou Reed, stating that the "lyrics are beautiful and they're really, really happy, but the music is really, really sad. It's that kind of thing, where you can create [differing] moods through the music and lyrics."

Parachutes was recognised to have an alternative rock, indie rock and post-Britpop, with some stylistic comparisons being made to contemporaries such as Radiohead and Travis. In fact, a few critics have suggested that the album's commercial success was due in part to a portion of Radiohead's audience being alienated by the band's experimental and more electronic-influenced Kid A album.

Release and promotion
Parachutes was released on 10 July 2000 in the United Kingdom by Parlophone. In the United States, it was released on 7 November 2000 by Nettwerk. The album has been made available on various formats since its release: both Parlophone and Nettwerk released it as a CD in 2000, while in the next year Parachutes enjoyed a cassette release made by newfound label Capitol Records. In China, the album's commercial release was forbidden due to "inflammatory political content", with the track "Spies" being singled out as the prime offender. In 2002, Parlophone issued the album as an LP. In November 2020, Coldplay released a 20th anniversary version in transparent yellow vinyl.

The main version of the record contains 10 tracks, with "Everything's Not Lost", the last of them, having a hidden song called "Life Is for Living", clocking in for a total of 7:15. The Japanese version contains all main tracks, plus "Careful Where You Stand" and "For You", which were originally released as the B-sides of "Shiver", the hidden song is on the pre-gap of track 11.

Four singles were released in total: "Shiver", "Yellow", "Trouble", and "Don't Panic". The first served as lead single in the United Kingdom while "Yellow" was used in the United States. Upon the release of "Trouble", Coldplay abandoned their initial plan of releasing "Don't Panic" as the album's fourth effort, since they deemed three singles were enough for an album. Despite this, however, it was released as a single in some European regions.

Critical reception
Parachutes was released to generally favorable reviews from music critics. At Metacritic, which assigns a normalized rating out of 100 to reviews from mainstream critics, the album received an average score of 72, based on 20 reviews. In a contemporary review of the album, Michael Hubbard of musicOMH called it "an album of remarkable depth, especially when one considers the youthful ages of the band members." Siobhan Grogan of NME stated that "all told, it's incredible this is a debut album" and concluded that "accomplished, yet subtle, it works perfectly as a whole in a way all the production skills in the world couldn't replicate." Melody Maker hailed Parachutes as a "masterpiece" and "a defining musical statement of 2000", while James Oldham of Uncut felt that the album "more than justifies the plaudits heaped upon [the band] by the weekly music press". The Guardian described the album as "one of the year's most uplifting albums", adding that it features "elegant songs, classic guitars and gorgeous singing".

While noting that Parachutes "brings nothing new to the table" and that its "musical reference points are immediately recognizable and difficult to overlook", Billboard stated that the band "seems talented enough to transcend this early identity crisis." Matt Diehl of Rolling Stone opined that the album "ultimately rises above its influences to become a work of real transcendence". In a retrospective write-up, MacKenzie Wilson of AllMusic commented that Parachutes introduced the band as "young musicians still honing their sweet harmonies", adding that the album "deserved the accolades it received because it followed the general rule when introducing decent pop songs: keep the emotion genuine and real."

In a less-enthusiastic review, Spencer Owen of Pitchfork called the album "harmless and pretty... [but] nothing else". Barry Walters, writing in The Village Voice, similarly writes that "there's little on Parachutes that demands attention or punctures the pensive spell, and, unlike Travis's, Coldplay's hooks are slight." In his Consumer Guide column for The Village Voice, Robert Christgau selected "Yellow" and "Don't Panic" as "choice cuts", indicating good songs on "an album that isn't worth your time or money." Setareh Yousefi of Stylus Magazine felt that "the finer moments of Parachutes are blended with some boring sappy songs", with Martin's "powerful voice" ultimately being "in many ways wasted on songs that are alright but not bewildering."

Rankings

Accolades

Commercial performance
The popularity of the songs in British clubs, pubs and sporting events led Parachutes to debut at number-one in the UK Albums Chart with 70,935 copies sold. Its biggest sales period, however, was during the penultimate week of 2000, when the album sold 170,642 copies and surpassed one million total sales. The record is certified 9× Platinum by the British Phonographic Industry for selling over 2,700,000 copies. In July 2011, it climbed from number 184 to number 48 for a 318th charting week. As of January 2018, the album remains Coldplay's third biggest in the country, behind A Rush of Blood to the Head (2.9 million) and X&Y (2.7 million). In 2022 Parachutes was named as the 10th most successful debut album in UK chart history. 

In the United States, Parachutes debuted at number 189 on the Billboard 200 five weeks after its release. It later peaked at number 51 and reached number one on the Billboard Heatseekers. Over two million copies have been shipped to the United States, leading to being certified 2× Platinum by the Recording Industry Association of America. It was also certified 3× Platinum in Australia by the Australian Recording Industry Association, and 2× Platinum in Canada by the Canadian Recording Industry Association. As of July 2020, Parachutes has sold 31,922 copies on cassette in UK, making it the 33rd best-selling cassette since 2000.

Legacy 

With nearly 2.7 million units sold in the United Kingdom, Parachutes is the 22nd best-selling album of the 21st century and 45th of all time in the country. It was also shortlisted for the 2000 Mercury Music Prize and the overall era earned the band many awards, including British Album of the Year at the Brit Awards, Best Album at the Q Awards and Best Alternative Music Album at the Grammy Awards.

British trade paper Music Week, praised it as one of the most-impressive debut albums ever, spawning the hit singles "Shiver", "Trouble" and "Yellow", with the latter getting included in Rock and Roll Hall of Fame's "Songs That Shaped Rock and Roll" list for being one of the most successful and important recordings in music. In 2010, Parachutes was placed in the book 1001 Albums You Must Hear Before You Die. In 2013, NME ranked it at number 272 on their "The 500 Greatest Albums of All Time" list.

While making a 20th anniversary review, Jon O' Brien from the Recording Academy labeled it as Coldplay's most influential album to date, impacting on the work of artists such as The Fray, Snow Patrol and OneRepublic. He also mentioned that Parachutes "ushered in a new wave of mild-mannered guitar bands". Despite the album's success, Chris Martin said that the band doesn't like it. He also commented that they look beyond: "We know that's terrible music and we always try to think about what we can do next."

Track listing

Personnel

Coldplay
Chris Martin – lead vocals, acoustic guitar, piano, keyboards
Jonny Buckland – electric guitar, piano (track 4), backing vocals (track 1)
Guy Berryman – bass guitar
Will Champion – drums, percussion, backing vocals

Technical
Ken Nelson – production , engineering
Coldplay – production 
Chris Allison – production , engineering , mixing 
Andrea Wright – engineering assistant
Jon Coles – engineering assistant
Paul Read – engineering assistant
Simon Barnicott – engineering assistant
Mark Phythian – computer magic
Michael H. Brauer – mixing
George Marino – mastering 

Additional personnel
Phil Harvey – management
Dan Keeling – A&R
Coldplay – design, cover photograph
Mark Tappin – design assistant 
Tom Sheehan – photography
Sarah Lee – photography

Charts

Weekly charts

Year-end charts

Decade-end charts

All-time charts

Certifications and sales

References

Cited works

External links

2000 debut albums
Albums produced by Ken Nelson (British record producer)
Capitol Records albums
Coldplay albums
Parlophone albums
Grammy Award for Best Alternative Music Album
Brit Award for British Album of the Year
Albums recorded at Rockfield Studios
Albums produced by Chris Allison